Sövdeborg Castle is a castle in Sjöbo Municipality, Scania, in southern Sweden.
Out of approximately 200 castles in Scania, this is one of about 25 which allows public visitors. The inside of the castle is decorated with  stuccos and an oak ceiling carved in cartilage baroque.

History
Frederik Lange acquired the estate from the crown in 1587 and in 1597, he erected a castle. After he died in 1614, his son sold the castle to Danish nobleman Tage Ottesen Thott (1580–1658). His son Otte Thagesen Thott (1607-1656) completed the building plans and rebuilding the castle into a Renaissance castle in 1642. 

In 1676, Thott sold it to Swedish Governor General Rutger von Ascheberg (1621–1693). The estate was owned by the Ascheberg family until 1735 when Johan August Meijerfeldt  (1664–1749) bought it. In 1788, it was purchased by Swedish Count Carl Gustaf Piper (1737-1803). Lieutenant Erik Carl Piper (1807-1849) became the owner of the castle in 1833. In the 1840s, he hired  architect Carl Georg Brunius (1792-1869)  and under his leadership a thorough restoration of the castle took place.

References 

Castles in Skåne County
Museums in Skåne County